Vonny Cornellya Permatasari known as Vonny Cornelia (born in Bogor, West Java 14 August 1979) is an Indonesian actress. Vonny once known as a member of the vocal group Bening.

Karier

Early career 
Vonny began her career as a model when she was selected as a cover girl for Mode magazine in 1992.

Bening 
In 1997, together with three fellow models, Dewi Murniaty, Ditasiani Oktovie and Vera Soedibyo, Vonny joined the vocal group Bening. Under the guidance of Yovie Widianto, Is Dody, and Carlo Saba of Jasmine Trias, Bening released their first album in 1997 titled "No Love".

Soap operas 
Vonny has appeared in multiple soap operas, including Let the People Speak, Kemuning, Lady Luck, Appoints One Star, Ali & Sevira, The Lovers, The Ring Two Love, and Time Keep Walking. She also featured in the film "Between Me, Piano, and a Poem" (2005).

Cinemography

Films 
 Antara Aku, Piano, dan Puisimu (2005)
 Mengaku Rasul (2008)

Soap operas
 Biarkan Orang Bicara (1995)
 Kemuning (1998)
 Hanya Kamu (1999)
 Dewi Fortuna (2000)
 Waktu Terus Berjalan (2000)
 Tunjuk Satu Bintang (2001)
 Terang Milikku Juga (2002&2004)
 Sebatas Impian (2005)
 Satu Cincin Dua Cinta (2006)
 Senyum Mba Yum
 Kasmaran
 3 Pengantin Untuk Ayahku
 Cinta dan Anugerah
 Kejora dan Bintang
 Putri Yang Ditukar (2010)
 Yusra dan Yumna
 Yang Masih Dibawah Umur (2012)
 Akibat Pernikahan Dini
 Putri Nomor 1 (2013)

FTV 
 Pacarin Aku dong Mba
 Sebening Airmata Ibu
 Tante,I'm Sorry

Discography

Albums 
 Ada Cinta (There is Love)
 Romantisme (Romanticism)

Single 
 Apa Yang Kaurasakan (What do you feel)
 Disisi Dirimu (Hand Love )( duet with Congq Perwira )

References

External links  
  
  

1979 births
Living people
Indonesian Christians
Indonesian actresses